Biar is a town and municipality in the comarca of Alt Vinalopó,  province of Alicante, Spain. Biar lies at the foot of the Serra de Mariola and is located 39 km from the city of Alicante.

The economy in Biar is based on manufacture, particularly  dolls, and pottery.

On the origin of the name of this town there are two versions, one says that it comes from the Latin word apiarium meaning "place of bees", justifying this giving the importance that Biar had as a producer and exporter of honey 
, and the other says it is derived from the Arabic word  (biʿar) «well» o بِئَار (biʿār) «wells»

Events
The Moros i Cristians festival of Biar is celebrated each year from May 10 to 13.

See also 
Castle of Biar
Route of the Castles of Vinalopó

References

External links

 Ayuntamiento de Biar, Town Hall of Biar, in Spanish.

Municipalities in the Province of Alicante